Judy A. Stamps is a professor and researcher within the Department of Evolution and Ecology at University of California, Davis.

Stamps' research focuses on conservation ecology and ethology. Specifically, her research is centered in behavioral ecology, habitat selection, animal personality, plasticity in lizard communication, and implications of developmental processes for problems in behavioral ecology and conservation biology.

Education
Stamps completed her Bachelor's (BA) at the University of California, Berkeley in 1969, majoring in Zoology. She then continued her studies and completed her Masters of Science (M.Sc.) in 1971 and Doctorate of Philosophy (PhD) in 1974.

Scientific contribution and honors/awards
Stamps received the ‘’Distinguished Animal Behaviorist’’ award by the Animal Behavior Society (ABS) in 2007.

She has also received the Allee Award (ABS 1972), Fellow Award (AAAS 1983, ABS 1991), Exemplar Award (ABS 1994), and the Mildred Mathias Award (1999).

References

2013, Animal Behavior 86(3): 641-649 
"Convergent evolution in the territorial communication of a classic adaptive radiation: Caribbean Anolis lizards", 2013, Animal Behavior 85(6): 1415-1426.

Living people
Conservation biologists
University of California, Berkeley alumni
University of California, Davis faculty
Year of birth missing (living people)